American country artist Crystal Gayle more than 20 award wins and honors.

Awards and honors

Academy of Country Music Awards
 Top New Female Vocalist (1975)
 Top Female Vocalist (1976)
 Top Female Vocalist (1977)
 Top Female Vocalist (1979)
 Cliffie Stone Pioneer Award (2016)

American Eagle Awards (NAMM)
 Lifetime Achievement Award (2017)

American Entertainment Magazine
 Best Female Entertainer (2007)

American Music Awards
 Favorite Female Country Artist (1979)
 Favorite Female Country Artist (1980)
 Favorite Female Country Artist (1986)
 Favorite Female Video Artist (1986)

Cherokee Medal Of Honor
 Awarded In Tahlequah, Oklahoma (2000)

Country Music Association Awards
 Female Vocalist Of The Year (1977)
 Female Vocalist Of The Year (1978)

Crystal Gayle Day
 October 2, 2009 - Hollywood, California

Grammy Awards
 Best Female Country Vocal Performance (1978) – "Don't It Make My Brown Eyes Blue"

Grand Ole Opry
 Member of the Grand Ole Opry - Inducted (2017)

Hollywood Walk Of Fame
 Star # 2390 Awarded (2007) – Unveiled (2009)

Indiana Historical Society
 Indiana Living Legend Award (2005)

Kentucky Music Hall Of Fame
 Inducted (2008)

Music City News
 Most Promising Female Artist Of The Year (1975)

Native American Music Association Hall Of Fame
 Inducted (2001)

People Magazine
 The 50 Most Beautiful People In The World (1983)

References

Gayle, Crystal